Metristepe is a village in the Bozüyük District, Bilecik Province, Turkey. Its population is 58 (2021).

References

Villages in Bozüyük District